Lewisburg, Arkansas was a town in southern Conway County, Arkansas. Founded as a trading post in 1825 by William Lewis, it served as the original county seat of Conway County from 1831 until 1883, when it ceded its role to Morrilton. 

While thriving as a town of nearly 2,000 residents along the Arkansas River up to the 1860s, the community was the site of significant Union troop occupation during the Civil War, from September 1863 through August 1865. Lewisburg witnessed several guerrilla killings in the area, also common in surrounding communities throughout the river valley. A skirmish in early 1865 effectively ended war activity in the county, ahead of the surrender that would conclude the overall war.

In the years immediately following the war, the community became unsettled amid conflict between local militia and the Ku Klux Klan in 1868, leading to major fires in town and a declaration of martial law by Governor Powell Clayton in December 1868. Desirability of Lewisburg as a ferry site along the river was superseded as years passed, first by the Little Rock and Fort Smith Railroad bypassing the town in 1875, and later with a bridge constructed in 1919 to carry traffic onward to Oppelo and other points south of the river.

The approximate area of Lewisburg is a neighborhood in the southeast portion of modern-day Morrilton.

References 

Ghost towns in Arkansas